Antti Jokela (born May 7, 1981) is a Finnish former professional ice hockey goaltender.  He played in the SM-liiga for Lukko and Ässät and also played in Sweden in the Elitserien for Timrå IK and Brynäs IF. He was drafted 237th overall by the Carolina Hurricanes in the 1999 NHL Entry Draft.

External links
 

1981 births
Living people
Ässät players
Brynäs IF players
Carolina Hurricanes draft picks
Finnish ice hockey goaltenders
HC Salamat players
Leksands IF players
Lukko players
Nybro Vikings players
Timrå IK players
People from Rauma, Finland
Sportspeople from Satakunta